Transparent is an American comedy-drama television series created by Joey Soloway for Amazon Studios that debuted on February 6, 2014. The story revolves around a Los Angeles family and their lives following the discovery that the person they knew as their father Mort (Jeffrey Tambor) is a transgender woman named Maura. Transparent'''s full first season premiered on September 26, 2014. The show was renewed for a second season on October 9, 2014, which premiered on December 11, 2015.  On June 25, 2015, Amazon renewed the show for a third season consisting of ten episodes. In August 2017, Amazon renewed the series for a fifth and final season, which ultimately took the form of a feature-length finale titled the Transparent Musicale Finale''. It does not include Tambor due to sexual harassment allegations.

 A film conclusion was released on September 27, 2019.

Series overview

Episodes

Season 1 (2014)

Season 2 (2015)

Season 3 (2016)

Season 4 (2017)

Film (2019)

References

External links

Lists of American comedy-drama television series episodes
Lists of American LGBT-related television series episodes